Imants Bleidelis (born 16 August 1975) is a Latvian former professional football midfielder. He made 106 appearances for the Latvia national team.

Club career
Born in Riga, Latvian SSR, Soviet Union, Bleidelis started his career at Skonto in 1992. In 1994, he played for Inter Skonto, and then between 1994 and 1999 he played 128 games scoring 24 games for Skonto. Skonto then sold him to English club, Southampton who were then in the Premier League, for £650,000, where he joined fellow countryman Marians Pahars. Bleidelis signed a three-and-a-half-year contract. He played only two league games in three seasons, and after being allowed to go on trial in Denmark with Superliga club, Viborg FF January 2003 Southampton released him on 26 January, and two days later he signed a two-year contract with Viborg, where he scored six goals in 55 appearances.

He left Viborg in winter 2004 after turning down a new contract. Despite offers from two Latvian clubs, Skonto and FK Venta in 2005 he moved to Austria to play for Austrian Bundesliga club Grazer AK where he signed a two-year contract. He made his debut for the club on 17 February 2005 in the UEFA Cup against English club Middlesbrough.

He moved back to Latvia in 2006 with FK Jūrmala. In 2007, he moved to FHK Liepājas Metalurgs. Bleidelis had his contract with FK Liepājas Metalurgs terminated on 7 July 2008 along with another Latvian international, Andrejs Rubins.

International career
Bleidelis played over 106 international matches and scored ten goals for the Latvia national team. He made his debut on 19 May 1995 against Estonia in the Baltic Cup. He played at the Euro 2004 finals and his 100th appearance came on 2 June 2007 against Spain in UEFA European Championship qualifier.

Honours
Skonto
 Virsliga (6): 1992, 1993, 1995, 1996, 1997, 1998
 Latvian Football Cup: 1992, 1995, 1997, 1998

Metalurgs
 Virsliga runners-up: 2007
 Baltic League: 2007
 Baltic Football: 2002

See also
 List of men's footballers with 100 or more international caps

References

External links

Profile at the Latvian Football Federation 
International career at www.rsssf.com

1975 births
Living people
Footballers from Riga
Association football midfielders
Latvian footballers
Latvia international footballers
Skonto FC players
Latvian Higher League players
Premier League players
Southampton F.C. players
Viborg FF players
UEFA Euro 2004 players
Grazer AK players
Austrian Football Bundesliga players
FIFA Century Club
Latvian expatriate footballers
Latvian expatriate sportspeople in England
Expatriate footballers in England
Latvian expatriate sportspeople in Denmark
Expatriate men's footballers in Denmark
Latvian expatriate sportspeople in Austria
Expatriate footballers in Austria